4º sen ascensor (English: 4º without elevator) was a Spanish-Galician sitcom which aired on TVG between 2004 and 2005. It was created and directed by Beatriz del Monte and aired 33 episodes.

Plot
Three students share a flat. Sebastian (or "Sebas"), a medical student, his cousin Lucy, a smart girl and good student and Fran, a parasite who exploits Sebastian continuously.

Cast
 Xulio Abonjo (Sebas)
 Cristina Castaño (Lucía)
 Xosé Barato (Fran)
 Mónica Camaño (Ana)
 Xoán Carlos Mejuto (Diego)
 César Goldi (Raúl)
 Laura Ponte (Maruxa)
 Pepe Soto (Pedro)
 Julia Gómez

References

2004 Spanish television series debuts
2005 Spanish television series endings
2000s Spanish comedy television series
Galician-language television shows